David Strelec (born 4 April 2001) is a professional Slovak professional footballer who plays as a forward for  club Reggina, on loan from Spezia. He represents the Slovakia national team.

Personal life
The son of former Slovak international footballer Milan Strelec, David Strelec was born in Nové Zámky. He is an only child.

Club career

ŠK Slovan Bratislava
Strelec made his Fortuna Liga debut for ŠK Slovan Bratislava against Zemplín Michalovce on 5 August 2018.

Reggina
On 31 January 2023, Strelec joined Serie B club Reggina on loan until the end of the 2022–23 season.

International career
In March 2021, Strelec was first called up to Slovak senior national team by Štefan Tarkovič for three 2022 FIFA World Cup qualification fixtures against Cyprus, Malta and Russia. He made his international debut on 24 March 2021, in first of said fixtures against Cyprus in Nicosia. Strelec came on as a replacement for Ondrej Duda after 83 minutes of play with the score at 0:0. While Slovak performance drew criticisms after the match, being labeled as "boring" and "spiritless", Strelec received some praise for creative and constructive passing that the team lacked in the earlier minutes of the match.

Career statistics

Club

International goals
Scores and results list Slovakia's goal tally first, score column indicates score after each goal.

Honours
Slovan Bratislava
Fortuna Liga (3): 2018–19, 2019–20, 2020–21
Slovnaft Cup (2): 2019–20, 2020–21

References

External links
 ŠK Slovan Bratislava official club profile 
 
 Futbalnet profile 
 Ligy.sk profile 
 

2001 births
Living people
People from Nové Zámky
Sportspeople from the Nitra Region
Slovak footballers
Slovak expatriate footballers
Slovakia youth international footballers
Slovakia under-21 international footballers
Slovakia international footballers
Association football forwards
ŠK Slovan Bratislava players
Spezia Calcio players
Reggina 1914 players
Slovak Super Liga players
Serie A players
Expatriate footballers in Italy
Slovak expatriate sportspeople in Italy